Antonio Cortesi (December 1796 – April 1879) was an Italian ballet dancer, choreographer, and composer. He was particularly known for the numerous ballets which he created and choreographed in the first half of the 19th Century for major Italian theatres, including La Scala, La Fenice, and the Teatro Regio in Turin.

Cortesi was born in Pavia, the son of the dancer and choreographer Giuseppe Cortesi and the ballerina Margherita Reggini.

Ballets
Many of Cortesi's ballets had music expressly composed for them by Luigi Maria Viviani. Others used existing pieces of music by a variety of composers, chosen and arranged by Cortesi. On occasion he composed some of the music himself, especially for his one-act ballets. Ballets devised and choreographed by Cortesi include:
Santa Genoveva, premiered Theatro de São Carlos, Lisbon, 23 February 1823
O mouro de Venezia, premiered Theatro de São Carlos, Lisbon, 28 April 1823
Furores de Oreste, premiered Theatro de São Carlos, Lisbon, 22 August 1823
Il castello del diavolo ossia La fiera, premiered Teatro Regio, Turin, 26 December 1825
Oreste, Luigi Maria Viviani (composer), premiered Teatro Regio, Turin, 26 December 1825
Chiara di Rosemberg, Luigi Maria Viviani (composer), premiered  Teatro Regio, Turin, 20 January 1826
Ines de Castro, Luigi Maria Viviani (composer), premiered  Teatro Regio, Turin, 20 March 1827
Merope, Luigi Maria Viviani (composer), premiered  Teatro Regio, Turin, 27 December 1828
L'ultimo giorno di Missolungi, Luigi Maria Viviani (composer), premiered La Fenice, Venice, 16 February 1833
Le piccole Danaidi, Luigi Maria Viviani (composer), premiered  Teatro Regio, Turin, 6 January 1834
Gismonda, Giovanni Bajetti and  Luigi Maria Viviani (composers), premiered La Fenice, Venice, 26 December 1835
Marco Visconti, Luigi Maria Viviani (composer), premiered La Scala, Milan, 19 October 1836
Il ratto delle donzelle veneziane, Luigi Maria Viviani (composer), premiered La Fenice, Venice, 26 December 1837
Nabuccodonosor, premiered Teatro Regio, Turin, 1838
Mazeppa, Luigi Maria Viviani (composer), premiered Teatro Comunale, Bologna, 1 October 1844
Fausto, Luigi Maria Viviani (composer), based on Jules Perrot's choreography for Faust, premiered Teatro Regio, Turin, 25 December 1851
La Gerusalemme liberata, Luigi Maria Viviani (composer), premiered Teatro Regio, Turin, 25 December 1852

References

Ballet choreographers
Italian male ballet dancers
Italian ballet composers
Musicians from Pavia
1796 births
1879 deaths
19th-century Italian ballet dancers